Epitopoietic Research Corporation (ERC) is a Belgian Pharmaceutical company developing ERC1671 (brandnames: Gliovac, Sitoiganap (EU)), which specialise in treatment for Glioblastoma multiforme which is the most aggressive form of brain cancer. In 2019, ERC became the first pharmaceutical company to provide treatment under the US Federal Right-to-try law.

History 
The genesis of ERC1671 occurred when Apostolos Stathopoulos was a neurosurgery student at the University of Liège. While observing an operation, a piece of a patient’s tumor hit his eye. This event provoked Stathopoulos to contemplation and to the evidence that his body's immune system would destroy the cancer cells.

2006 
Stathopoulos conducts a proof-of-concept study on rats. The study finds that the combination of Syngeneic and allogeneic glioma cells injected into rats with growing tumors reduce the size and even eradicate the existing tumors and prevented the formation of new tumors. Stathopoulos patents the technique and founds ERC to develop the treatment for humans.

2009 
ERC obtains Advanced Medical Therapy Product status for Gliovac/ERC1671 from the European Medicines Agency. It creates a tissue bank for proliferative tumors and a Good Manufacturing Practice-compliant production facility in Schaijk, Netherlands.

2011 
Gliovac obtains Orphan Drug status from the US FDA. Glioblastoma multiforme is the most common and deadly brain tumor in adults, but only affects 10,000-17,000 people in the US. By definition, an orphan disease affects under 200,000 people in the USA.

2012 
First patients are treated with Gliovac/ERC1671 under a doctrine of compassionate use. In September, the first patient reached total remission.

2013 
Phase II trials of Gliovac/ERC1671 begins in partnership with the University of California, Irvine.

2018 
Interim phase II trial results show that patients treated with Gliovac/ERC1671 and the commonly prescribed anti-cancer drug bevacizumab(Atavan) survived almost five months longer on average than those treated with bevacizumab alone.

2019 
At the request of a patient, Gliovac/ERC1671 is the first medication prescribed under the US Federal Right-to-try law passed by the Trump Administration. Despite being prescribed under Federal law, the treatment follows the protocols of California’s state Right-To-Try laws. ERC makes Gliovac available at free or reduced cost for Right-To-Try patients.

2020 
ERC submits a European Medicines Agency marketing application authorization for ERC1671 under the brand name Sitoiganap. A second trial site opens at Harvard’s Dana Farber Center For Immuno-Oncology. ERC begins development of a COVID-19 vaccine called COVIDVAC based on Gliovac technology.

Leadership 
Apostolos Stathopoulos (Co-Founder, CEO) is a neurosurgeon trained in Belgium. He is Chief of Neurosurgery Service at the Henry Dunant Hospital in Athens, Greece; Visiting Professor at the Department of Cell Biology and Immunology of Wageningen University and Adjunct Associate Professor of Neurological Surgery at the Keck School of Medicine of the University of Southern California. He serves as Co-Director of International Immunotherapy Cancer Center. For pioneering treatment under US Federal Right-To-Try laws, Stathopoulos was named humanitarian of the year by the Abigail Alliance.

Thomas Chen (Co-Founder, CMO) is a neurosurgeon and professor at the University of Southern California. He is one of the few fellowship trained spinal surgeons focused on spine cancer. Virgil Schijns (Chief Scientific Officer) is the Registered Qualified Person for Gliovac/ERC1671 in the EU. Joseph Elliot is the Managing Director of ERC-USA, ERC's US Subsidiary.

Products 
Sitoiganap (EU)/Gliovac/ERC1671 is an immunotherapy vaccine that trains the body’s immune system to attack a Glioblastoma (brain tumor) using cells taken from the patient’s own tumor, along with tumor cells from three other donors. Unlike most vaccines, it is only given to patients who have already developed the disease, rather than prophylactically. By receiving tumor cells from different people, the patient’s immune system is exposed to several different tumor-associated antigens (TAA), or proteins, minimizing the chance that tumor cells might escape from the body’s defenses. It also is believed this approach will trigger a stronger cytotoxic T-lymphocyte (CTL, or a “cell-killing” T-cell) response against the TAA on the patient’s tumor. In the first group of nine patients treated under the compassionate use doctrine, 100% survived for six months compared to only 33% in the control group. At ten months, 77% survived, compared to 10% in the control group. ERC1671 is currently in Phase II trials in the US, as well as being available under compassionate use protocols and right-to-try laws. According to the Innovation Observatory of the UK’s National Health Service: The key principle underlying this particular vaccination approach is the use of a broad set of tumour antigens, derived from freshly resected whole tumour tissue – not only from the patient under treatment, but expanded to include the same from three independent GBM tissue donors. This multivalent array of autologous and allogeneic antigens is expected to reduce the chance of immune escape, which can emerge from antigenic loss or active major histocompatibility complex (MHC) downregulation and is more likely to occur when using a single- or limited-antigen targeted immunotherapy. The future promise of this treatment might also rest in the ability to combine it with bevacizumab, and potentially with immune checkpoint inhibitors – an option that will allow more powerful immune activation in the periphery as well as more aggressive local tumour immunological targeting and destruction.

In April 2020, ERC began development on COVIDVAC, a vaccine for COVID-19 based on ERC1671’s underlying technology.

References

Orphan drug companies
Oncology
Belgian companies established in 2006